Marcus Andreas Danielson (born 8 April 1989) is a Swedish professional footballer who plays as a defender for Allsvenskan club Djurgårdens IF
. A full international between 2019 and 2022, he won 19 caps for the Sweden national team and represented his country at UEFA Euro 2020.

Club career

Early career 
Danielson played for the fourth tier football club IFK Eskilstuna until he successfully trialled for top tier club Helsingborgs IF in the summer of 2007. At Helsingborgs IF he struggled to break into the first team and the club allowed him a free transfer to third tier club Västerås SK on 27 July 2009.

Västerås SK 
Danielson gained considerably more playing time at Västerås SK and by the 2010 league season he was integral part of the team that won the division title and promotion into the Superettan. The club struggled in the second tier and at the end of the 2011 league season they were relegated. While at Västerås, Danielson played center back alongside his future Sweden international team mate Victor Nilsson Lindelöf.

GIF Sundsvall 
On 8 February 2012, Danielson  transferred to newly promoted top tier club GIF Sundsvall for the start of the 2012 Allsvenskan. He made his league debut on 31 March 2012 in a 1–0 defeat to Kalmar FF. The club were relegated at the end of the season after losing a relegation play-off to Halmstads BK. Danielson  remained at the club, which finished runners-up in the 2014 Superettan and were promoted back into Allsvenskan.

Djurgårdens IF 
On 12 February 2018, Danielson signed for top tier club Djurgårdens IF. He made his league debut in the first game of the campaign on 1 April 2018 against Östersunds FK, scoring the only goal of the game.

On 10 May 2018, Danielson played as Djurgården beat Malmö FF 3–0 in the Swedish Cup Final.

He played in 27 games and was selected as the league's Most Valuable Player when Djurgården won the 2019 Allsvenskan.

Dalian Professional 
On 28 February 2020 Danielson became Djurgården's most expensive outbound transfer ever, when he was sold to the Chinese club Dalian Professional based in Dalian for more than 50 million SEK.

He made his debut for Dalian on 26 July 2020, scoring a goal in a 2–3 loss to Shandon Luneng. In his second game for the club, he picked up a red card when conceding a penalty in a 1–1 draw against Henan Jianye.

International career

Youth 
Danielson represented the Sweden U17 and U19 teams a total of 5 times between 2006 and 2007.

Senior 
On 7 October 2019, Danielson was called up by to the Sweden national team squad for the UEFA Euro 2020 qualifying games against Malta and Spain as a replacement for the injured central defender Pontus Jansson. He scored from a corner ten minutes into his debut, in what ended up as a 4–0 victory for Sweden over Malta. On 14 November 2020, he scored his second international goal in a 2–1 win against Croatia in the 2020–21 UEFA Nations League A, though he also scored an own goal against the same opponent, which contributed to Sweden's eventual relegation. He scored his third international goal in a friendly with Armenia on 5 June 2021.

UEFA Euro 2020 
He was named in Sweden's UEFA Euro 2020 squad in May 2021, and started in all three group stage games alongside Victor Lindelöf as a centre back. On 29 June 2021, Danielson was sent off in the Round of 16 game against Ukraine following a foul on Artem Besyedin as Sweden was eliminated in extra-time.

2022 FIFA World Cup qualifying and retirement 
Danielson played in five 2022 FIFA World Cup qualifying games as Sweden failed to qualify for the 2022 FIFA World Cup after losing to Poland in the UEFA Second Round Path A final on 29 March 2022.

On 12 May 2022, Danielson announced his retirement from the national team. He won a total of 19 caps and scored 3 goals for Sweden.

Career statistics

Club

International

International goals

Scores and results list Sweden's goal tally first.

Honours
Västerås SK
 Division 1 Norra: 2010

Djurgårdens IF
 Allsvenskan: 2019
 Svenska Cupen: 2017–18
Individual
 Allsvenskan Most valuable player: 2019
 Allsvenskan Defender of the year: 2019
 Allsvenskan Player of the Month: July 2019

References

External links

1989 births
Living people
People from Eskilstuna
Swedish footballers
Sweden youth international footballers
Sweden international footballers
Association football defenders
GIF Sundsvall players
Djurgårdens IF Fotboll players
Dalian Professional F.C. players
Allsvenskan players
Superettan players
Ettan Fotboll players
Chinese Super League players
UEFA Euro 2020 players
Swedish expatriate footballers
Swedish expatriate sportspeople in China
Expatriate footballers in China
Sportspeople from Södermanland County